The 1992 AAA Championships was an outdoor track and field competition organised by the Amateur Athletic Association (AAA), held from 27 to 28 July at Alexander Stadium in Birmingham, England. It served as the British trials event for the 1992 Summer Olympics and was considered the de facto national championships for the United Kingdom, ahead of the 1992 UK Athletics Championships.

Medal summary

Men

Women

References

AAA Championships
AAA Championships
Athletics Outdoor
AAA Championships
Sports competitions in Birmingham, West Midlands
Athletics competitions in England